Fraunhofer l3enc was the first public software able to encode pulse-code modulation (PCM) .wav files to the MP3 format. The first public version was released on July 13, 1994. This commandline tool was shareware and limited to 112 kbit/s. It was available for MS-DOS, Linux, Solaris, SunOS, NeXTstep and IRIX. A licence that allowed full use (encoding up to 320 kbit/s) cost 350 Deutsche Mark, or about $250 (US).

Since the release in September 1995 of Fraunhofer WinPlay3, the first real-time MP3 software player, people were able to store and play back MP3 files on PCs. For full playback quality (stereo) one would have needed to meet the minimum requirements of a 486DX4/100 processor.

By the end of 1997 l3enc stopped being developed in favour of its successor MP3enc. Development of MP3enc stopped in late 1998 to favour development of a parallel branch FhG had been developing for some time, called Fastenc. None of these programs are still marketed. An mp3 Surround encoder and mp3HD codec and Software Tools are now promoted on the Fraunhofer MP3 website.

External links 
 Encoders are available at ReallyRareWares.

See also 
 LAME – free software codec used to encode/compress .mp3 audio

References 

1994 software
MP3
Audio codecs